Ein Bayer auf Rügen is a German comedy/crime television series, broadcast in 81 episodes between 1993 and 1997.

See also
List of German television series

External links
 

German comedy television series
German crime television series
Television shows set on islands
1993 German television series debuts
1997 German television series endings
German-language television shows
Sat.1 original programming